The West Indies cricket team visited Pakistan in November 1991 and played a three-match Limited Overs International (LOI) series against the Pakistan national cricket team. West Indies won the series 2–0 with the second match tied. West Indies were captained by Richie Richardson and Pakistan by Imran Khan.

One Day Internationals (ODIs)

West Indies won the series 2-0, with one match tied.

1st ODI

2nd ODI

3rd ODI

References

External links

1991 in Pakistani cricket
1991 in West Indian cricket
International cricket competitions from 1991–92 to 1994
Pakistani cricket seasons from 1970–71 to 1999–2000
1991